Khulood  (also transliterated as Khulud and Kholud) is an Egyptian 1948 romance film. It starred Faten Hamama, Kamal al-Shennawi, and Ezz El-Dine Zulficar, who also directed and wrote the film. It is the only movie that Zulficar has acted in.

Plot
A man named Mahmoud falls in love with Layla, a beautiful lady. Another man, Hasan, has also fallen in love with Layla. Layla is shot as a consequence of their vying for her affections. Amal, Layla's daughter, also loves Nabil, Hasan's son.

Cast
Faten Hamama as Layla / Amal.
Kamal al-Shennawi as Hasan / Nabil.
Ezz El-Dine Zulficar as Mahmoud.
Ismail Yasseen as Ismail.

References
 Film summary, Faten Hamama's official site. Retrieved on December 29, 2006.

External links
 

1948 films
1940s Arabic-language films
1940s romance films
Egyptian romance films
Egyptian black-and-white films
Films directed by Ezz El-Dine Zulficar